Tejima is a Japanese surname. Notable people with the surname include:

, Japanese artist and children's book illustrator
, Japanese educator
, Japanese gravure idol, television personality and actress

See also
8731 Tejima, a main-belt asteroid

Japanese-language surnames